Drapetisca is a genus of dwarf spiders that was first described by Anton Menge in 1866. They are common on tree trunks from July to September, and they feed on insects and smaller spiders.

Species
 it contains four species:
Drapetisca alteranda Chamberlin, 1909 – USA
Drapetisca bicruris Tu & Li, 2006 – China
Drapetisca oteroana Gertsch, 1951 – USA
Drapetisca socialis (Sundevall, 1833) (type) – Europe, Caucasus, Russia (Europe to Far East), Central Asia, China, Japan

See also
 List of Linyphiidae species (A–H)

References

Araneomorphae genera
Cosmopolitan spiders
Linyphiidae